Kimuraya Sohonten is a bakery which was first established in 1869 as Bun'eidō (文英堂)  by a former samurai, Yasubei Kimura.  It was then renamed Kimuraya in 1870.  Kimura invented the anpan sweet bun in 1874 and this became popular with the Emperor and so sold well.

References

Bakeries of Japan